Baron of Rio Preto is a Brazilian noble title created by Emperor Pedro II of Brazil, by decree of December 6, 1854, in favor of Domingos Custódio Guimarães.

Holders 

 Domingos Custódio Guimarães (1802–1868) – first viscount  of Rio Preto;
 Domingos Custódio Guimarães Filho (?–1876) – second baron of Rio Preto.

References 

Empire of Brazil
Brazilian noble titles
Barons